Ferndale, New Zealand may refer to:
 Ferndale, Taranaki, a suburb of New Plymouth
 A fictitious suburb of Auckland in which the television programme Shortland Street takes place.